Akwamu expansion in Ghana started between 1629 and 1710. The powerful king Otumfuo Ansa Sasraku I annexed the Guan and took over the traditional areas of the Kyerepon. According to Akwamu tradition, Otumfuo Ansa Sasraku I, also played an important role in the life of the King Osei Tutu I of Asante by protecting him from the Denkyera.

Succession
History indicates that the Akwamuhene and Dormaahene were twin brothers who were both at Akwamu. However, the two got separated after the death of the Great King Ansa Sasraku about 400 years ago when there was the need to install one of them as the next king. According to history, the kingmakers were divided over who should succeed the king. Some preferred the elder brother while others favoured the younger one. And in order to avoid any conflict, the younger one, the Dormaahene, moved out of Akwamu with his supporters and journeyed through various parts of the country and finally settled at present day Dormaa Ahenkro.

The first President of Ghana, Dr Kwame Nkrumah tried to broker peace between the two traditional areas.
During the Nkrumah-powered reunification process which brought the two states together, the Akwamuhene by then, Odeneho Kwafo Akoto II and then Dormaahene, Nana Dr Agyemang Badu I, made a treaty in 1960 to inter-marry so as to keep their blood ties.

Akwamu regal list

References

Titles of national or ethnic leadership
Society of Ghana